The politics of Bavaria takes place within a framework of a federal parliamentary representative democratic republic, where the Federal Government of Germany exercises sovereign rights with certain powers reserved to the states of Germany including Bavaria.

The state has a multiparty system dominated by the Christian Social Union in Bavaria (CSU). Bavaria has long been a bastion of conservative politics in Germany, with the Christian Social Union has won every election of the state parliament since 1946 and having almost a monopoly on power. Every Minister-President since 1957 has been a member of this party. On the other hand the bigger and more liberal, or rather social democratic, cities, especially Munich, have been governed for decades by the Social Democratic Party of Germany (SPD) until recently the second biggest party. In 2018 the Alliance 90/The Greens which have been represented in the state parliament since 1986, became the second biggest political party in the Landtag and in 2020 the biggest party in the Munich City Council. From the historical point of view, older Bavaria was one of the most liberal, predominantly Roman Catholic states until the rather rural areas of Swabia and Franconia were added in 1814/15 at the Congress of Vienna.

In 1995 the Bavarians decided to introduce direct democracy on the local level in a referendum. This was initiated bottom-up by an association called Mehr Demokratie (More Democracy). This is a grass-roots organization which campaigns for the right to citizen-initiated referendums. In 1997 the Bavarian Supreme Court aggravated the regulations considerably (e.g. by introducing a turn-out quorum). Nevertheless, Bavaria has the most advanced regulations on local direct democracy in Germany. This has led to a spirited citizens’ participation in communal and municipal affairs – 835 referendums took place from 1995 through 2005.

Constitution 
The Constitution of Bavaria was enacted on 8 December 1946. It is the fourth constitutional document in Bavarian history after the Constitution of 1808, the Constitution of the Kingdom of Bavaria in 1818 and the Bamberg Constitution of 1919.

The Bavarian State Parliament 

Bavaria has a unicameral Landtag, or state parliament. The 180 members of the Landtag (plus additional overhang and leveling seats) are elected for a period of five years by universal suffrage. The Landtag may dissolve itself with a majority vote of its legal number of members or be dissolved by means of a state-wide referendum.

Until December 1999, there was also a Senat, or Senate, whose members were chosen by social and economic groups in Bavaria, but following a referendum in 1998, this institution was abolished.

The Landtag resides in the Maximilianeum, a building rich in tradition built on the banks of River Isar by King Maximilian II in the 19th century.

The Bavarian State Government 

Bavaria Cabinet since 12 November 2018

The Bavarian State Government is the supreme executive authority of the state. It consists of the Minister-President of Bavaria and up to 17 state ministers and state secretaries. The Minister-President as head of government is elected for a period of five years by the Landtag. With the approval of the Landtag he appoints and dismiss the members of the State Government.

The State Government is composed of the:
 State Chancellery
 Ministry of the Interior, for Sport and Integration
 Ministry for Housing, Construction and Transport
 Ministry of Justice
 Ministry for Education and Culture
 Ministry for Science and Art
 Ministry of Finance and for Home Affairs
 Ministry for Economic Affairs, Regional Development and Energy
 Ministry for Environment and Consumer Protection
 Ministry for Food, Agriculture and Forestry
 Ministry for Family, Labour and Social Affairs
 Ministry for Health and Care
 Ministry for Digital Affairs

Bavaria state elections

Electoral system

Bavaria uses mixed-member proportional representation to elect its members of the Landtag. Party representation is not apportioned statewide, the distribution of seats takes place separately within the seven administrative districts, which are referred to in the constitution as constituencies (Wahlkreise). The constituencies are divided into electoral districts (Stimmkreise) in which one member is directly elected. The number of single member districts is about half the number of seats in the constituency.

Since the 2018 state election seats and single member districts are distributed as follows:

Since the 1950 state election every elector has two votes, one for a candidate in their electoral district and one for a candidate in their constituency. All district (local) candidates are also constituency (regional) candidates with their parties. The parties may also nominate constituency-only candidates. To prevent double voting, the constituency ballots in each district omit the candidates running in that district. Members in single-member districts are elected by first-past-the-post, based just on the first (district) votes. The distribution of seats in the constituencies are made by proportional representation which takes into account the parties' aggregate first (district) votes combined with their second (constituency) votes. Seats are allocated using the Hare-Niemeyer method, after in 1992 the Bavarian Constitutional Court ruled the use of the D'Hondt method in state elections unconstitutional. To compensate if a party wins more electoral district seats in a constituency than its votes would entitle it to (these extra seats are termed overhang seats), the other parties receive leveling seats in the constituency too, increasing the number of seats for the constituency. There is no statewide adjustment of the seats. Only Parties and groups of voters who obtain at least 5% of the total votes (sum of first and second votes) in Bavaria participate in the distribution of seats. This threshold also applies to winning single-member districts; a party will forfeit all its district seats that it won if the party did not meet the 5% statewide threshold, with the forfeited district seats going to the second-place candidate.

Bavaria uses an open-list system for the constituency seats. For the distribution of list seats, a candidate is ranked within the list by the number of first votes received within the district plus the number of second votes received from voters elsewhere in the constituency. In this manner, voters collectively produce a list that is different from what the party submitted, which can result in the defeat of candidates that would have been elected (and vice versa) had the election taken place under a closed-list system.

Next election

According to the Bavarian Constitution, the election must be held on a Sunday "at the earliest 59 months, at the latest 62 months" after the preceding state elections  unless the Landtag is dissolved, in this case the new election shall be held at the latest on the sixth Sunday after the dissolution. The elections since 1978 have always taken place between mid-September and mid-October. The next election is expected to take place 2023.

Past elections

The state election was held on 14 October 2018. The CSU lost its majority with a worse result than in 2008.

The state election was held on 15 September 2013. The CSU won an absolute majority of the seats in the Landtag, while the FDP, a coalition party in the outgoing Bavarian government, did not receive enough votes to enter the new parliament.

The state election was held on 28 September 2008. The CSU had its worst result since the Adenauer era, and lost its majority in the Landtag for the first time in 46 years.

The state election was held on 21 September 2003. The CSU won more than two-thirds of the seats in the Landtag. No party in post-war German history had achieved this before.

See also

Monarchism in Bavaria after 1918

References